Yoshi Sodeoka is a Japanese-born artist and musician who has been producing art projects since the early 1990s. In 1989 he moved to New York City to study art and design at the Pratt Institute.

His digital artwork has been featured on numerous DVDs, film festivals, art galleries, and in exhibitions at the Whitney Museum of American Art, Turbulence.org, Creative Time's Holiday Light Shows at the Grand Central Terminal and OFFF Festival in Spain. In addition, Sodeoka lectured widely on the topic of digital art and design and has juried design awards for Webby Award, the Art Director's Club, the One Club, the Society of Publication Designers and the .MOV Festival held by Shift Japan. He was a contributing writer for Artbyte magazine in which he wrote a bi-monthly column about underground digital culture.  Prior to that, he was the founding art director of Word Magazine, one of the Web's oldest and most influential ezines, which launched in 1995. Sodeoka's work is in the permanent collections of New York's Museum of the Moving Image as well as the San Francisco Museum of Modern Art.

References

External links
 Yoshi Sodeoka's portfolio site

Year of birth missing (living people)
Living people
Pratt Institute alumni
People from Hiroshima Prefecture
Japanese emigrants to the United States